Ballyhooly GAA is a Gaelic Athletic Association club located in the village of Ballyhooly, County Cork, Ireland. The club fields teams in both hurling and Gaelic football. The club plays in the Avondhu division of Cork GAA.

Honours
 Cork Junior B Football Championship (1): 2016
 North Cork Junior A Hurling Championship (1): 2008
 Cork Junior B Hurling Championship Winners (2) 1985,1995

External links
Ballyhooly GAA site

Further Details

Ballyhooly GAA facilities are located within the Ballyhooly Community Sportfield. There is a clubhouse, a gymnasium, an Astro-turf hurling wall area and 2 GAA pitches. Within the Sportsfield facility there are also 2 tennis courts with an adjacent tennis clubhouse and a children's playground.

Gaelic games clubs in County Cork
Gaelic football clubs in County Cork
Hurling clubs in County Cork